Babice is a municipality and village in Třebíč District in the Vysočina Region of the Czech Republic. It has about 200 inhabitants.

Administrative parts
The village of Bolíkovice is an administrative part of Babice.

History
The first written mention of Babice is from 1349. The village of Bolíkovice was first mentioned in 1358.

The municipality is known for the Babice Trial where 11 people were sentenced to death in a political trial for the murder of three Communist Party functionaries in the Babice school in 1951.

References

External links

Villages in Třebíč District